Bao Bei'er (born 3 May 1984) is a Chinese actor.

He is noted for his roles as Lu Maoku and Zhang Kai in the films Welcome to Shama Town and So Young respectively.

Early life
Bao was born and raised in Harbin, Heilongjiang, his parents divorced when he was 10 years old. Bao graduated from Beijing Film Academy, majoring in acting.

Career

Acting career
Bao's first film role was uncredited appearance in the film Furious Piano (2007). That same year, he also acted in Home with Kids 3, a Chinese sitcom starring Song Dandan, Andy Yang, and Zhang Yishan.

In 2008, Bao played the character Huo Qubing in the historical television series Dongfang Shuo.

For his role as Lu Maoku in Welcome to Shama Town, Bao was nominated for the Favorite Actor Award at the 16th Beijing College Student Film Festival.

In 2011, Bao participated in The Founding of a Party as Kuang Husheng, and he also appeared as Hou Xia in Mural, a Chinese epic fantasy film starring Deng Chao, Betty Sun, and Yan Ni.

In 2012, Bao had a supporting role in the film The Four. Bao reprised his role as Da Long in the sequel, The Four 2 (2014). At the same year, Bao appeared in Yu Zheng's Palace 2, a historical romantic comedy television series starring Du Chun and Mickey He, he received the TV Drama Awards nomination for Best New Actor.

In 2013, Bao played the role of Zhang Kai in Zhao Wei's film So Young, for which he received nominations at the Huabiao Awards. Bao also had a cameo appearance in Swordsman, based on the wuxia novel The Smiling, Proud Wanderer by Jin Yong.

Personal life
Bao married his university love Bao Wenjing in July 2013.

Filmography

Film

Television

Variety

Awards and nominations

References

External links

1984 births
Male actors from Harbin
Living people
Beijing Film Academy alumni
Male actors from Heilongjiang
Chinese male film actors
Chinese male television actors